Metcalfe may refer to:

Places
Metcalfe, Ontario, a Canadian community
Metcalfe, Mississippi, a US town
Metcalfe, Victoria, a locality in Australia
Metcalfe, Georgia, a US town
Metcalfe County, Kentucky

Other uses
Metcalfe (surname)
Metcalfe's law, describes the relationship between the effects of a telecommunications network and the number of connected users
Metcalfe Station (OC Transpo), a bus stop in Ottawa, Canada
W. Metcalfe and Son, an English publishing company

See also
Metcalf (disambiguation)
Metcalfe Street (disambiguation)